The Haggin Stakes was an American Thoroughbred horse race run annually at Hollywood Park Racetrack in Inglewood, California. Raced in mid-June, it was open to two-year-old horses and was contested on dirt over a distance of five and one half furlongs.

Inaugurated in 1940, there was no race in 1942 and 1943. After the 1982 running the event was put on hiatus until being revived in 1996. After fifty years in which it was raced, the Haggin Stakes was canceled in 2005 following a shortage of entrants. It has not been run since.

The race was run in two divisions in 1940, 1941, 1944, 1963, 1964, and 1971.

Notable past winners include the 1959 Kentucky Derby winner, Tomy Lee and the 2001 Champion Sprinter and winner of the Breeders' Cup Sprint, Squirtle Squirt

Winners 1996-2004

Earlier winners
1982 - Full Choke
1981 - Unpredictable
1980 - Loma Malad
1979 - Murrtheblurr
1978 - Revielle
1977 - Windy's Duke
1976 - Bright Cross
1975 - Telly's Pop
1974 - The Bagel Prince
1973 - Century's Envoy
1972 - Doc Marcus
1971 - Royal Champion
1971 - D B Carm
1970 - Kelly's Caper
1969 - Cupid's Wings
1968 - Good Manners
1967 - Trondheim
1966 - Tumble Wind
1965 - Royal House
1964 - Ter - Chi - Berzo
1964 - Fleet son
1963 - The Scoundrel
1963 - Nevada P J
1962 - Kicapu Kid
1961 - Indian Blood
1960 - Olden Times
1959 - Psyches First
1958 - Tomy Lee
1957 - Music Man Fox
1956 - Lucky Mel
1955 - Mobile
1954 - Mr. Sullivan
1953 - James Session
1952 - Little Request
1951 - Bull Chicle
1950 - Hindu Star
1949 - Prince Abbey
1948 - Audacious Man
1947 - Roman In
1946 - Shim Malone
1945 - Style Prince
1944 - Realization
1944 - Sea Swallow
1941 - Outbid
1941 - Vain Prince
1940 - Ira Pan
1940 - Tin Pan Alley

References
 June 20, 2005 Los Angeles Times article titled Haggin Stakes Is Canceled

Ungraded stakes races in the United States
Discontinued horse races
Hollywood Park Racetrack
Recurring sporting events established in 1940